Ivan Hodúr (born 10 July 1979) is a former Slovak football midfielder.

Career
Hodúr began his playing career with Nitra, appearing in 56 league matches during his first two seasons. On 14 January 2012, he signed a one-year contract with Polish club Zagłębie Lubin.

Match fixing 
In September 2013, Hodúr (and 6 other present or former football players) was accused of match fixing during his time at Dunajská Streda. FIFA considered his case and condemned him with a 25-year-long ban from football activities.

References

External links
 
  Club Profile

1979 births
Living people
Sportspeople from Šaľa
Slovak footballers
Slovakia international footballers
FC Nitra players
Czech First League players
FC Slovan Liberec players
FK Mladá Boleslav players
Zagłębie Lubin players
FC DAC 1904 Dunajská Streda players
Slovak Super Liga players
Expatriate footballers in the Czech Republic
Expatriate footballers in Poland
Slovak expatriate sportspeople in Poland
Slovak expatriate sportspeople in the Czech Republic
Match fixers
Association football midfielders